Joseph Langton (c. 1637 – 17 March 1720), of Newton Park, near Bath, Somerset was an English politician.

He was a Member of Parliament for Bath from 1690 to 1695. He was an ancestor of the Temple-Gore-Langton family, created in 1822 Earl Temple of Stowe.

Succession
His principal heir was his grandson, Joseph Langton, the son of his only surviving daughter by her first husband and cousin, Robert Langton. In 1762–1765 he rebuilt the mansion at Newton Park, which building survives today.

References

1637 births
1719 deaths
English MPs 1690–1695
People from Bath, Somerset